Borj-e Zeydanlu (also Romanized as Borj-e Zeydānlū; also known as Borj and Zeydānlū) is a village in Quchan Atiq Rural District, in the Central District of Quchan County, Razavi Khorasan Province, Iran. At the 2006 census, its population was 442, in 114 families.

References 

Populated places in Quchan County